Ai Ai Ai ni Utarete Bye Bye Bye is FLOW's twenty seventh single. Its A-Side was used as the second opening theme song for the anime Samurai Flamenco. The single has two editions: regular and limited. The limited edition includes a bonus DVD. It reached number 44 on the Oricon charts and charted for three weeks. *

Track listing

Bonus DVD Track listing

References

2014 singles
2014 songs
Flow (band) songs
Ki/oon Music singles
Anime songs